Parkan-e Al-e Musa (also Romanized as Parkān-e Āl-e Mūsá) is a village in Rudbar Rural District, Ruydar District, Khamir County, Hormozgan Province, Iran. At the 2006 census, its population was 120, in 27 families.

References 

Populated places in Khamir County